Asterius may refer to:

 Asterion or Asterius, multiple figures in Greek mythology
 Asterius of Ostia (d.223), Christian martyr and saint
 Asterius of Caesarea (d.262), Christian martyr and saint
 Asterius, Claudius and Neon (d. 303), Christian martyr and saint
 Asterius of Petra (d. 365), Bishop of Petra and saint
 Asterius of Amasia, bishop of Amasia, later in the 4th century
 Asterius (comes Hispaniarum), Roman general who defeated the Vandals in Hispania in various battles.
 Asterius the Sophist, philosopher
 Turcius Rufius Apronianus Asterius, Roman consul for 494